Labdia torodoxa is a moth in the family Cosmopterigidae. It is found on the New Hebrides, the Solomon Islands and Java.

Subspecies
Labdia torodoxa torodoxa
Labdia torodoxa solomonensis Bradley, 1961 (Solomon Islands, Java)

References

Natural History Museum Lepidoptera generic names catalog

Labdia
Moths described in 1928